Union of Fighters may refer to:

Association of Fighters of Yugoslavia, Yugoslav nationalist organization
A unit of Greek-Cypriot nationalist organization EOKA (1955–59)
"Pan-Hellenic Union of Fighters", active in the Greek Civil War (1946–49)
National Union of Freedom Fighters, active in Trinidad and Tobago (1970s)
Union of Islamic Fighters, active in the Soviet–Afghan War